Radjin de Haan (born 12 August 1969) is a retired Dutch footballer and currently is a football manager. During his career he served Telstar, FC Eindhoven and FC Den Bosch. He was one of the footballers that survived the Surinam Airways Flight PY764 air crash in Paramaribo on 7 June 1989. He was the only player to return on the pitch after the disaster.

De Haan was known as a talented player and started his career at Telstar where he made his debut. He was the youngest footballer (18) to be invited by Sonny Hasnoe, the founder of the Colourful 11 to be part of the team and travel to Suriname to play in the "Boxel Kleurrijk Tournament" with three Surinamese teams. The Surinam Airways Flight PY764 crashed during approach to Paramaribo-Zanderij International Airport, killing 176 of the 187 on board, making it the worst ever aviation disaster in Suriname's history. Among the dead were a total of 15 members of the Colourful 11, only three of them, including De Haan survived. After the crash De Haan saw dead bodies all around him. He managed to grab a little kid and brought himself and the kid in safety, while having a fractured vertebra.

Despite the broken vertebra he was able to return on the football pitches seven months after the disaster, making him the only player who survived the crash to make a comeback. Unfortunately for him he was unable to get his old form back and was forced to withdraw from professional football. He played for several amateur sides like FC Lisse, Holland Utrecht and the Koninklijke HFC. He later got another chance in professional football and was signed by FC Eindhoven. Later he would also move to FC Den Bosch, but in both occasions his injury prevented him from any outstanding performances.

After his career he became an amateur football manager and led the Koninklijke HFC to position eleven of the "Sunday 1A class" in the 2002-03 season, his first season as a manager. He managed the Koninklijke HFC for another two years, but moved to Geel Wit'20 in between (2004–05). He then moved to VV Young Boys, playing in the "Saturday 4E class" and became league champions in the 2005-06 season, resulting in promotion. A year later when the team played in the "Saturday 3C class" they would become champions again and were promoted to the second class for the 2007-08 season. At the end of the 2007-2008 season they became champions again and promoted to the first class for season 2008-2009. De Haan is following a managers education and his wish is to become a professional football manager in the near future.

External links
De Haan at Voetbal International

References
 Crash report
 Crash website AndroKnel.nl 
 Short biography of Radjin de Haan 
 Managing career profile at trainers.voetbalnederland.nl 
 Iwan Tol: Eindbesteming Zanderij; het vergeten verhaal van het Kleurrijk Elftal 

1969 births
Living people
Dutch footballers
Dutch football managers
Dutch sportspeople of Surinamese descent
SC Telstar players
FC Eindhoven players
FC Den Bosch players
Eerste Divisie players
Survivors of aviation accidents or incidents
FC Lisse players
Association football forwards
Koninklijke HFC players